Zhu Fang (born 2 October 1976) is a female Chinese-born table tennis player who now represents Spain.

She competed at the 2008 Summer Olympics, reaching the second round of the singles competition. She also competed in the team competition.

She was born in Beijing.

References
2008 Olympic profile

1976 births
Living people
Spanish female table tennis players
Table tennis players at the 2008 Summer Olympics
Olympic table tennis players of Spain
Chinese emigrants to Spain
Table tennis players from Beijing
Naturalised table tennis players
Naturalised citizens of Spain
Mediterranean Games bronze medalists for Spain
Mediterranean Games medalists in table tennis
Competitors at the 2009 Mediterranean Games